Sideline(s) may refer to:

 Extended side, the geometric line that contains the side of a polygon
 Sidelines, the lines that mark the outer boundaries of a sports field
 Sideline (app), a smartphone app
 Sidelines (newspaper), the student newspaper of Middle Tennessee State University
 Sideline, a side road in the concession road system of Upper and Lower Canada
 Side Line, a 1987 album by Onyanko Club
 "Sidelines", a 2022 song by Phoebe Bridgers

See also
 Sideliners, an Australian comedy sport television chat show